Friends and Years is a 1965 Soviet drama film directed by Viktor Sokolov.

Plot 
The plot focuses on representatives of one generation, whose lives were influenced in different ways by the formation of the Soviet Union.

Cast 
 Aleksandr Grave as Vladimir Platov
 Natalya Velichko as Lyuda
 Yury Yakovlev as Yuri Derzhavin
 Zinovy Vysokovsky as Grisha Kostanetsky
 Nina Veselovskaya as Tanya
 Oleg Anofriev as Vadim Lyalin
 Vladimir Kenigson as Kukanov
 Natalya Antonova as Nadya
 Ivan Kudryavtsev as Pechersky (as I. Kudriavtsev)
 Pavel Boriskin as Andrey (as Pasha Boriskin)
 Vyacheslav Nevinny as Igor

References

External links 
 

1965 films
1960s Russian-language films
Soviet drama films
1965 drama films